USS Munwood (ID-4460) was a cargo steamship that was built in Scotland in 1914 and was part of the United States Merchant Marine until 1928. From 1918 to 1919 she served in the United States Navy. In 1928 Yugoslav interests bought her and renamed her Vila. In 1935 she sank as the result of a collision in the Adriatic Sea.

Building
Scotts Shipbuilding and Engineering Company built Munwood at Greenock on the Firth of Clyde as yard number 457. She was launched on 7 May 1914 and completed later that year.

Munwoods first owner was the Crossburn Steamship Company, which was a Scottish subsidiary of the Munson Steamship Line of the United States. Munson gave many of its ships names beginning with "Mun-". She was registered in Glasgow, and her United Kingdom official number was 136299.

US ownership
Later in 1914, Munwoods ownership was transferred to the US parent company, and she was re-registered in New York. Her US official number was 212924 and her code letters were LFDM. By 1918 she was equipped for wireless telegraphy, and her call sign was KUH.

From 29 September 1917 Munwood carried cargoes to France. She was defensively armed with one 5-inch/40-caliber gun and one 3-inch/50-caliber gun, and US Navy armed guards were added to her complement to crew her guns.

On 16 October 1918 the US Navy acquired Munwood, and on 26 October at Baltimore it commissioned her as USS Munwood with the Identification Number (ID) 4660. She was assigned to the Naval Overseas Transportation Service Army Account. On 29 November, two and a half weeks after the Armistice of 11 November 1918, she left Baltimore for France carrying about 4,000 tons of US Army stores, including 1,500 tons of gasoline in drums.

The Naval History and Heritage Command claims that on 10 December Munwood answered a distress signal from a Portuguese steamship called Queda, took her in tow, and reached Bermuda on 15 December. However, records of the existence of a Portuguese merchant ship of that name at the time are lacking.

On arrival at Bermuda, gasoline was found to be leaking from some of the drums in Munwoods cargo, spreading fumes throughout the ship. For safety her cargo was discharged in Bermuda, and she loaded 6,483 tons of coal instead. On 27 December 1918 she left Bermuda and on 10 January 1919 she reached Quiberon in Brittany, but the port was so busy that there was no berth for her, so she diverted to Nantes, where she discharged her cargo on 20 January.

Munwood was damaged in a collision with the British cargo steamship Baylula. Munwood was repaired, and then loaded a cargo of 2,500 tons of shrapnel plus ballast. On 30 January she left Nantes and on 18 February she reached Bermuda, where she discharged the shrapnel. She continued to Baltimore, where the Navy decommissioned her on 3 March and returned her via the United States Shipping Board to her owners.

Vila
In 1928 Brodarsko Akcionarsco Drustvo "Oceania" bought Munwood, renamed her Vila and registered her in Susak in Dalmatia. Her Yugoslav code letters were JTVR, and by 1934 her four-letter call sign was YTFB.

On 20 February 1935 Vila was en route from Trieste to Venice, carrying a cargo of phosphates and wheat, when she was involved in a collision at the mouth of the Piave with the Italian motor ship Rodi. Vila sank as a result, and four of her crew were killed. Rodi rescued the survivors.

References

Bibliography

1914 ships
Cargo ships of the United States Navy
Cargo ships of Yugoslavia
Maritime incidents in 1935
Ships built on the River Clyde
Steamships of the United States
Steamships of Yugoslavia
Shipwrecks in the Adriatic Sea
World War I cargo ships of the United States